Red Hill Farm is a historic home located near Pedlar Mills, Amherst County, Virginia.  The main house was built about 1824–1825, and is a -story, Federal style brick dwelling. It has a double-pile, central-hall plan. It measures 55 feet by 42 feet, and has a slate covered hipped roof.  Also on the property are a contributing brick kitchen building and "Round Top," the former overseer's residence dating to the late-18th century.

It was added to the National Register of Historic Places in 1980.

References

Houses in Amherst County, Virginia
Houses completed in 1825
Federal architecture in Virginia
Houses on the National Register of Historic Places in Virginia
National Register of Historic Places in Amherst County, Virginia